Franck is a Croatian coffee, tea and snacks company.

Based in the city of Zagreb, it was founded in 1892 as a part of the German multinational company "Heinrich Franck Söhne" which started operating on June 21, 1883. Prior to World War II, Franck produced coffee substitutes, but in the last 50 years it has enriched production by introducing various innovations. By doing so, it expanded its product range to coffee, tea, snacks, spices, powdered sugar and condiments. After it was privatized in 1992, Franck undertook the task of modernizing its company. It introduced numerous innovations in the market, such as ground coffee Franck Crema, which can be prepared as instant coffee as well as regular coffee, tea infusion Coolup! which can be prepared with cold water, or various flavors of Franck Café Cappuccino.Franck detto in Italiano,è un surrogato.
In 2015, Franck partnered with Intersnack and founded a joint venture company for the production and distribution of snacks called Adria Snack Company Ltd.

History

Brands and products

Ground coffee 

In the category of ground coffee Franck is the leader on the Croatian market with its Jubilarna coffee, while the range also includes Franck 100% Arabica, Franck 100% Arabica hazelnut-chocolate, premium "single-origin" coffees Costa Rica and Guatemala and Espresso coffee.  Also, Franck Crema was launched in 2015. The range also includes ground coffees Gloria and Victoria.

Franck Jubilarna coffee 
Jubilarna vacuum-packed coffee is the iconic packaging for which Franck is best known. It is popularly known as "Ciglica" (the little brick) for its red color and square shape. The production of Jubilarna started in 1972.

Franck Café 
Franck's brand of instant coffee and cappuccinos combines a number of beverages which are characterized by quick preparation (with hot water) and a diverse range of flavors. Franck Café includes:
 Cappuccino in versions Classic, Vanilla, Chocolate, Irish Cream, Coconut and white chocolate, Jaffa, Winter, with less sugar and no caffeine as well as Bananaccino and Jagodaccino, hot drinks for children which do not contain coffee
 Instant coffee in versions Classical, Gold and Decaffeinated
 Instant coffee blends in versions 3 in 1, 2 in 1, 3 in 1 cocoa and Ice Coffee

Franck Tea 
A wide range of Franck teas includes black, green and yellow tea, fruit teas (different flavors with a special line Voćni+Moćni) and herbal teas (with a special line Trag prirode), as well as lines specifically designed for children (Fora tea), season or time of day (Ritual). Franck was the first Croatian company to launch fruit tea in filter bags in 1991, and in 2015 it introduced the innovative line Coolup! - a drink made from the essence of tea and cold water. Also, in 2015 is launched the premium line Franck Superiore Tea that is available exclusively in the HoReCa channel.

Other products 
Franck also produces semolina, polenta, powdered sugar and sodium bicarbonate, as well as coffee substitutes and hot chocolate mixes.

Adria Snack Company Ltd. 
Adria Snack Company Ltd. is a joint venture partnership between Franck and Intersnack, which was achieved in 2015. The venture is headquartered in Zagreb, with Dubravko Folnović as its CEO. The goal of the partnership is the realization of a long-term joint strategy of a strong focus on business development in the area of salty snacks. The range of brands and products includes Čipi čips, Kroki kroket, Tip-top, nuts, Chio, Kelly's, funny'frisch and Pom bar.

HoReCa 
In the HoReCa channel Franck is represented with some products that are not available in retail like Franck Superiore Tea, Stretto and Superiore espresso and espresso brands Classic and Bonus espresso.

Awards and recognitions 
In 2014 Franck won the Grand Prix and Gold Effie in the category of food for the campaign for its Čipi Čips called "CROmpiri". In the category of drinks, the campaign for Franck Café Cappuccino "Get creative" won the silver Effie. 
In 2012 and 2013, Franck Cafe instant coffee has been awarded the Best Buy designation.

Links 
Official website

References

Food and drink companies established in 1892
Food and drink companies of Croatia
Croatian brands
Coffee brands
Tea brands
Manufacturing companies based in Zagreb
1892 establishments in Croatia
Coffee in Europe
Agriculture companies of Croatia